4,5,6 is the debut studio album by American rapper Kool G Rap, released on September 26, 1995, on Cold Chillin' Records. The release followed his break-up with DJ Polo in 1993. The album was mostly received neutrally among critics, but was warmly accepted by underground fans. Despite the album's dark, grimy street sound, it peaked at number one on the R&B/Hip-Hop chart, and the single "Fast Life" charted on the Billboard Hot 100. The album features guest appearances from B1, MF Grimm, and Nas (who also appeared on the front cover), as well as production from Dr. Butcher, Naughty Shorts, T-Ray, and Buckwild of D.I.T.C.  It would also be Cold Chillin' Records' final release before it went defunct in 1997.

Background and recording
Following the critical acclaim of a three-album run with DJ Polo, Road to the Riches (1989), Wanted: Dead Or Alive (1990) and Live and Let Die (1992), Kool G Rap chose to concentrate his efforts in a more underground direction, in continuation with the sound on his albums with DJ Polo. In early 1993, Kool G Rap separated from DJ Polo in the aftermath of the media controversy surrounding the cover art of their previous album Live and Let Die. The cover – which depicted two police officers being hanged – followed the “Cop Killer" controversy involving Time Warner and Warner Bros. Records. Warner Bros. Records ultimately refused to distribute Live and Let Die, resulting in the termination of its contract with Cold Chillin' Records.  Live and Let Die was eventually released and distributed independently by Cold Chillin' in 1992. In 1995, Cold Chillin' signed a distribution deal with Epic, of which 4,5,6 was the first to be released under the new deal. For the recording of 4,5,6, Kool G Rap retreated to the rural wilds of Bearsville, New York.

Composition

Content 
The title track "4,5,6" depicts the urban street game of Cee-lo and how the game is played along with rhymes of a braggadocio nature and his success and skill at cee-lo. The song starts with the notes from "Mysterious Traveler" by Weather Report which are used throughout the entire song and give the song a very dark street sound.

The second single "It's a Shame" contains a prime example of mafioso themes and self boasting. In the song, Kool G Rap portrays himself as a heroin kingpin from a first person prospective, boasting of his wealth, power and extravagant lifestyle. However, it is implied that he harbors a sense of remorse over his choice of trade, with the chorus (sung by an uncredited Sean Brown) stating:

"Now it's a damn shame, what I gotta do just to make a dollar
Living in this game, sometimes it makes you wanna holler"
 
The song "For Da Brothaz" details the falling of his friends and the unforgiving struggle on the streets of New York.

On the album's lead single "Fast Life", Kool G Rap and Nas (credited under the alias Nas Escobar) rap about their business ventures and mafioso lifestyle. The video for the single revolves around the construction of the mythical "Fast Life Hotel and Casino".

Critical reception

Track listing 

Sample credits 
"4,5,6" samples "Mysterious Traveller" by Weather Report.
"It's a Shame" samples "Love Is for Fools" by Southside Movement.
"Take 'Em to War" samples "A Divine Image" by David Axelrod.
"Executioner Style" samples "Leroy the Magician" by Gary Burton.
"For Da Brothaz" samples "Soulsides" by Art Farmer and "Power of Soul" by Idris Muhammad.
"Blowin' Up in the World" samples "What You Won't Do For Love" by Bobby Caldwell.
"Fast Life" samples "Happy" by Surface.
"It's a Shame (Da Butcher's Mix)" samples "Bamboo Child" by Ryo Kawasaki.
"Money on My Brain" samples "Chameleon" by Herbie Hancock and "Overnight Sensation" by Avalanche.

Album singles

Charts

Weekly charts

Year-end charts

See also
List of number-one R&B albums of 1995 (U.S.)

References

Kool G Rap albums
1995 albums
Albums produced by Buckwild
Cold Chillin' Records albums
Mafioso rap albums